724 Hapag is a minor planet orbiting the Sun in the asteroid belt that was found by Austrian astronomer Johann Palisa in 1911 and named after the German shipping company Hamburg America Line.

Photometric observations of this asteroid at the Organ Mesa Observatory in Las Cruces, New Mexico in 2011 gave a light curve with a period of 3.1305 ± 0.0001 hours and a brightness variation of 0.11 ± 0.01 in magnitude.

References

External links 
 
 

Background asteroids
19111021
Hapag
Hapag